Three gymnastics disciplines were contested at the 2012 Olympic Games in London: artistic gymnastics, rhythmic gymnastics and trampolining. The trampoline events were held at the North Greenwich Arena (normally called The O2 Arena) from 3 to 4 August; the artistic events were also held at the North Greenwich Arena, from 28 July to 7 August. The rhythmic gymnastics events took place at Wembley Arena from 9 to 12 August.

A total of 54 medals were awarded across the three disciplines. The most successful nation was China, winning five gold medals and 12 in total. Brazil and South Korea won their first gold medal in the discipline in the history of the Summer Olympic Games. Yevgeniya Kanayeva of Russia marked history by becoming the first back-to-back Olympic champion at the individual all-around in rhythmic gymnastics.

Qualification

Qualification was based on the results of the 2011 World Rhythmic Gymnastics Championships held in Montpellier, France, from 19 to 25 September; the 2011 World Artistic Gymnastics Championships in Tokyo, Japan, from 7–16 October; the 2011 Trampoline World Championships in Birmingham, United Kingdom, from 17 to 20 November; and Olympic test events held in January 2012 at the North Greenwich Arena.

Schedule

Overall medal table

Events

Artistic gymnastics

Men's events

Women's events

Rhythmic gymnastics

Trampoline

Judging controversies

The men's artistic team all-around final became the subject of controversy when the judges were booed by the crowd following Japan's Kōhei Uchimura's score for his pommel horse routine, and how it shuffled the medals of Japan, Great Britain, and Ukraine.

References

External links 

 
 
 
 
 
 
 
 
 
 Fédération Internationale de Gymnastique

 
2012 Summer Olympics events
Olympics
2012
International gymnastics competitions hosted by the United Kingdom